Ifunanyachi Achara   (born 28 September 1997) is a Nigerian professional footballer who plays as a forward for Houston Dynamo in Major League Soccer.

Early life
Achara was born in Enugu, Nigeria and grew up in the south east of Nigeria, where he lived until 2014 at the age of 17. He was noticed by former Nigerian national team player Jay-Jay Okocha who recommended him for the Nigerian U17 national team.  He ultimately failed to make the roster for the team which won the 2015 FIFA U-17 World Cup.

Afterwards, he moved to the United States, where he played youth soccer with Chicago Magic SC and won 2015 U-17 US National Youth Championship.  He attended Berkshire School in Sheffield, Massachusetts, where he was named to the High School All-America game Best XI, in his senior year.  At Berkshire, he was on the soccer and track teams with his future Black Rock FC and Toronto FC teammate Jacob Shaffelburg.

College career
After high school, Achara attended Georgetown University and played four seasons with the Hoyas in the Big East Conference of the NCAA. He was plagued by injuries throughout his four seasons causing him to miss several games each season. In his junior season, Achara was a First Team All-Big East honoree and a Second Team All-East Region selection. In 2019, he was named a team captain in his senior season, helping them win the 2019 NCAA title, which was the school's first national championship in its program history, and was named to the All-Big East Second Team. Over his four-year career with the Hoyas, he scored 21 goals and seven assists in 55 games.

Club career

GPS Portland Phoenix
Achara appeared for USL PDL side GPS Portland Phoenix in 2016 where he scored six goals in eight matches and helped lead  them to win the PDL Northeast Division.

Black Rock FC
While at Georgetown, Achara played with Black Rock FC in USL League Two in 2018 and 2019 where he served as the team captain for both seasons. He finished as the joint leading scorer for the team in 2018 with eight goals, tied with Jacob Shaffelburg, as the team won the PDL Northeast Division title. He was named to the PDL Eastern All-Star team in 2018.  While at Black Rock, he was ranked as the #13 Top Prospect in USL League Two.

Toronto FC

Achara was selected 25th overall in the 2020 MLS SuperDraft by Toronto FC. After an impressive showing in pre-season, he was signed to the first team on 21 February 2020.

Achara made his debut on 7 March 2020, during Toronto FC's season home opener. Achara supplied a man of the match performance. He appeared to score the opening goal in the 11th minute, however the goal would be ruled off-side in a VAR decision. Achara went on to score the only goal of the game in the 81st minute as Toronto beat New York City FC 1–0. During the training camp for the MLS is Back Tournament, following the league stoppage due to the COVID-19 pandemic, Achara tore his ACL, after getting tangled up with teammate Omar Gonzalez during a drill, ending his rookie season after only playing one game. After his extended injury absence, he returned to the lineup on August 4, 2021 as a substitute against the Philadelphia Union, 17 months after his last appearance. Achara scored his first goal of the 2021 MLS season and the first since recovering from his ACL injury against CF Montreal August 27, 2021. On December 1, Toronto announced they had picked up Achara's contract option, keeping him with the club for the 2022 MLS season. After the end of the 2022 season, he departed the club, after the club declined his option for 2023.

Houston Dynamo
In the 2022 MLS Re-Entry Draft, he was selected in the second stage by the Houston Dynamo. On 7 December 2022, Achara signed with the Dynamo for their 2023 season, with a club option to extend his stay for 2024.

Personal life
His family still lives in Engu, Nigeria, while his younger brother, Ugo Achara Jr., has a soccer scholarship to Northwestern University in Chicago, where he is part of the soccer program. In June 2020, following the murder of George Floyd during the COVID-19 pandemic by four member of the Minneapolis Police Department, he spoke out about racism, which he was not aware of until he went to the United States, noting that the way one is treated there boils down to skin colour, and it's sad that is still an issue in society. In October 2020, he started a campaign to raise money for the End SARS campaign to disband the Nigerian Special Anti-Robbery Squad that has a long history of committing abuses.

Career statistics

Club

Honours

Club 
GPS Portland Phoenix
PDL Northeast Division winners: 2016

Black Rock FC
PDL Northeast Division winners: 2018

Toronto FC
Canadian Championship: 2020

References

External links
Georgetown bio
MLS bio
Toronto FC bio

1997 births
Living people
Association football forwards
Berkshire School alumni
End SARS activists
Footballers from Enugu
Nigerian expatriate footballers
Nigerian footballers
Georgetown Hoyas men's soccer players
GPS Portland Phoenix players
Houston Dynamo FC players
Major League Soccer players
Soccer players from Massachusetts
Toronto FC draft picks
Toronto FC players
USL Championship players
USL League Two players